Bernard, known as Backkom (Hangul: 빼꼼) in South Korea and Berni in Spain, is a computer-animated television series produced by RG Animation Studios, with the investment of the French broadcaster M6. The animation style is of a combination of computer-generated and cel animation. The stories are written by the creative studio Screen21, the directors are José Luis Ucha Enríquez and Claudio Biern Lliviria. The music was written by Oscar Maceda Rodríguez. Bernard also was a part of Cartoon Network's Sunday Pants.

In South Korea, season 1 aired on EBS TV in 2006 and consists of 52 episodes. Season 2 aired in 2009, and it also consists of 52 episodes.

Plot
The show centers on a curious polar bear named Bernard, whose bumbling slapstick antics and clumsiness typically result in the bear being knocked unconscious or being severely injured by the end of an episode. Bernard almost doesn't speak, but he does communicate through guttural sounds. Bernard’s friends include Lloyd and Eva the penguins, Zack the lizard, and Goliath the chihuahua.

Episodes

Films

A feature film based on Bernard, titled Mug Travel in South Korea and My Friend Bernard in English, was first released in South Korea on 22 March 2007. It was directed by Lim Ah-ron and produced at RG Animation Studios.

Another film, titled Backkom Bear: Agent 008 was released in China on 13 January 2017 and South Korea on 3 May 2017.

A third film, titled Agent Backkom: Kings Bear was released in China and South Korea on July 23, 2021.

Award history
Bernard has been nominated for a number of awards, including Best Animation series at the Stuttgart Festival of Animated Film (2006), Mipcom Jr. Licensing Challenge Award (2004), Prize in Children and Education at the Dong-A International Festival of Cartoon & Animation (2004) and was a finalist at the Annecy International Animation Festival (2003).

 Nominated for The Best Animation Series at Stuttgart Festival of Animated Film (2006)
 Mipcom Jr. Licensing Challenge Award (2004)
 Won the Prize in Children and Education at DIFECA (Dong-A International Festival of Cartoon & Animation) (2004)
 Was the finalist in Annecy International Animation Festival (2003).

See also
Mug Travel
Backkom Bear: Agent 008
Agent Backkom: Kings Bear

References

External links 
 
 Screen21 Website
 

2006 South Korean television series debuts
2000s South Korean animated television series
2010s South Korean animated television series
2006 French television series debuts
2000s French animated television series
2010s French animated television series
French children's animated comedy television series
Spanish children's animated comedy television series
South Korean children's animated comedy television series
Surreal comedy television series
Computer-animated television series
Animated television series about bears
Animated television series without speech